Krisztina Garda (born 16 July 1994) is a Hungarian water polo player. At the 2016 and the 2020 Summer Olympics she competed for the Hungary women's national water polo team in the women's tournament.

She won the Women's LEN Trophy in 2018 playing for Dunaújváros.

See also
 List of World Aquatics Championships medalists in water polo

References

External links
 

1994 births
Living people
Sportspeople from Budapest
Hungarian female water polo players
Water polo players at the 2016 Summer Olympics
Water polo players at the 2020 Summer Olympics
World Aquatics Championships medalists in water polo
Universiade medalists in water polo
Universiade gold medalists for Hungary
Universiade silver medalists for Hungary
Medalists at the 2017 Summer Universiade
Medalists at the 2020 Summer Olympics
Olympic bronze medalists for Hungary in water polo
Medalists at the 2019 Summer Universiade
21st-century Hungarian women